The Peoples Party of Kenya (PPK) is a political party in Kenya. Its leader is Jacob Wangai Gitau.

History
Established in 1996, the PPK nominated seven National Assembly candidates for the 2007 general elections. Although it received only 0.15% of the national vote, it won a single seat, party leader David Njuguna Kiburi Mwaura in Lari.

Despite nominating 12 National Assembly candidates for the 2013 elections and increasing its vote share to 0.4%, the party failed to win a seat. However, it won council seats in Meru, Kitui and Makueni counties.

References

External links
Official website

Political parties in Kenya
1996 establishments in Kenya
Political parties established in 1996